The Nordderby or North derby is a match between Hamburger SV and Werder Bremen, the two most successful and popular clubs in Northern Germany. The Hamburger SV (HSV) was created in 1887 and plays its matches at the Volksparkstadion. Meanwhile, Werder Bremen was founded in 1899 with Weserstadion as its home ground.

Beyond football, there is also a rivalry between the cities of Hamburg and Bremen, which are only separated by a hundred kilometers and they are also the two biggest metropolises in this part of the country.

Circumstances regarding the rivalry between the two clubs 
The match between Werder Bremen and Hamburger SV is the most frequently played match in the Bundesliga: Bremen played in the Bundesliga from 1963 to 1980 and from 1981 to 2021, while Hamburg were a Bundesliga club without interruption from 1963 to 2018. The fact that Werder Bremen and HSV are the biggest clubs in Bremen and Hamburg respectively, said cities being the biggest Hanseatic cities and also the biggest in the north of the country contribute to the rivalry. The catchment areas of Hamburger SV and Werder Bremen border on each other and overlaps between the two are not uncommon. In particular, there is an overlap in the districts (Landkreis) of Cuxhaven and Rotenburg (Wümme), which belong to Lower Saxony. Fans of both clubs are neighbours and the majorities differ according to location. A contribution to the rivalry was also made by the death of Adrian Maleika, a Werder Bremen fan, who was hit by a stone by Hamburg hooligans in the run-up to a match between Hamburger SV and the Bremen club in the DFB Cup in 1982, and he succumbed to the stone throwing in a Hamburg hospital. The relationship between Werder Bremen supporters and the Hamburgers was considered "quite normal" until this event.

History
The game was first contested in 1927 with HSV recording a 4-1 away win. Since the founding of the Bundesliga in 1963, the match has been held twice every season, except in 1980–81, because Werder had been relegated to the 2. Bundesliga in the previous season. To date, 152 games have been contested with Werder holding a slight lead of 57 wins to HSV's 53. 42 games have ended in a draw.

The pinnacle of the rivalry came in 2009 when they met four times in 18 days. Two of the four matches came in European competition at the semi-final stage of the last edition of the UEFA Cup. After losing 1-0 at home in the first leg, Werder won 3-2 in Hamburg to advance to the final on away goals. In the  2021–22 season the nordderby has been played in 2. Bundesliga for the first time, after the relegation of Werder in the 2020–21 season, and the third consecutive failure promotion of HSV, after the relegation in 2017–18.

All-time results
Results since the formation of Bundesliga in 1963.

Head to head
Overall match statistics.

* Cup game finished 1–1 after 120 minutes, won by Werder Bremen on penalties.

Honours

Head-to-head ranking in Bundesliga (1964–2022)

External links 
 
 
German football statistics and information

Hamburger SV
SV Werder Bremen
Association football rivalries in Germany
Football in Hamburg
Football in Bremen (state)